The Baylor Bears women's volleyball team represents Baylor University in National Collegiate Athletics Association (NCAA) Division I competition.  The women's volleyball program at Baylor University began in 1978.  Ryan McGuyre has been the coach since 2015.  The team plays its home matches at Ferrell Center.

Baylor had historically used "Lady Bears" as its women's sports nickname, but over time all women's teams dropped "Lady". Volleyball was one of the last three holdouts, with the others being basketball and soccer; all three teams became simply "Bears" effective with the 2021–22 school year.

Championships

Conference Championships

Coaching staff

See also
List of NCAA Division I women's volleyball programs

References

External links